This is the list of cathedrals in Lebanon sorted by denomination.

Catholic (various rites)
Cathedrals of the Catholic Church in Lebanon:
Patriarchal Seat in Bkerké (Maronite Rite)
 Cathedral of St. Georges in Ehden
 Church of Our Lady of Zgharta in Zgharta
 Cathedral of Our Lady of Annunciation in Beirut (West Syriac Rite)
 St. Barbara Cathedral in Baalbek (Melkite Greek)
 Cathedral of St. Stephen in Batroun (Maronite Rite)
 Cathedral of St. Louis in Beirut (Latin Rite)
 Saint George's Cathedral in Beirut (Maronite Rite)
 Cathedral of St. Elias Beirut (Melkite Greek)
 Cathedral of St. Maroun in Zgharta
 St. Elie-St. Gregory the Illuminator Patriarchal Cathedral in Beirut (Armenian Catholic)
 Cathedral of St. John Mark in Byblos (Maronite Rite)
 Cathedral of St. Elijah in Sidon (Maronite Rite)
 Cathedral of St. Nicholas in Sidon (Melkite Greek)
 St. Michael Cathedral in Tripoli (Maronite Rite)
 Maronite Cathedral in Tyre (Maronite Rite)
 Cathedral of Our Lady of Deliverance in Zahleh (Melkite Greek)
 Cathedral of St. Raphael - Baabda, Mount Lebanon (Chaldean Rite)

Oriental Orthodox
Armenian Apostolic cathedrals in Lebanon:
 Saint Gregory the Illuminator Cathedral in Antelias (Holy See of Cilicia)

Eastern Orthodox
Eastern Orthodox cathedrals in Lebanon:
 Saint George Cathedral in Beirut (Greek Orthodox Church of Antioch)
Saint Nicolas Cathedral in Achrafieh, Beirut. 
Saint Dimitrios Cathedral in Achrafieh, Beirut.
Saint Nicolas Cathedral in Ballouneh, Mount Lebanon. 
Saint Georgios Cathedral in Jdeideh, Mount Lebanon. 
Saint Georgios Cathedral in Bsalim, Mount Lebanon. 

 Saint George Cathedral in Tripoli (Greek Orthodox Church of Antioch)
Saint Georgios Cathedral in Mina, Tripoli. 
the Resurrection Cathedral in Kfaraaka, Koura. 
 Saint Nicholas Cathedral in Zahlé (Greek Orthodox Church of Antioch)
Saint Nicolas Cathedral in Sidon, the south of Lebanon.

See also

List of cathedrals
Christianity in Lebanon

References

Cathedrals
 
Lebanon
Cathedrals